Norwalk Township is a township in Pottawattamie County, Iowa, USA.

History
Norwalk Township was organized in 1873. It was named by a resident who hailed from Norwalk, Connecticut.

References

Townships in Pottawattamie County, Iowa
Townships in Iowa